Federated Insurance Company of Canada ("Federated Insurance") is a direct writer of property and casualty insurance products headquartered in  Winnipeg, Manitoba, Canada. The Company has approximately 370 employees in nine offices across Canada, with approximately 150 in Winnipeg. Federated Insurance has an A. M. Best rating of "A (Excellent)."

History

During the 1890s, the retail implement dealers in Minnesota formed an association, which proved to be very successful. In 1904, these dealers decided to try to reduce their insurance costs by organizing their own insurance company.

Initially, the Company was known as the Minnesota Implement Mutual Fire Insurance Company, and retained this name for many years. They would later become the Mutual Implement and Hardware Insurance Company, then Federated Mutual Implement and Hardware Insurance Company and, finally, Federated Mutual Insurance Company ("Federated Mutual").

On January 1, 1948, Federated Mutual entered the casualty insurance field, and was one of the first major insurance companies to write both fire and casualty insurance. In November 1949, accident and health coverage was added, with group accident and health insurance being written for various trade associations and employer groups. Federated Life Insurance Company ("Federated Life") was organized in January 1959.

Canadian History

 In September 1920, Federated Mutual began operating in Canada.
 By 1933 the sales force had increased from two to 17 representatives, and the annual premium income was approximately $1 million, primarily from hardware and implement business.
 Early in 1944, Federated Mutual aggressively went after and obtained endorsements from farm equipment manufacturers and associations across the country. This paved the way for writing insurance for many farm equipment dealers during the next few years.
 Expanded into the Casualty business in 1948. This brought a tremendous boost to the growth and development of the Canadian operation.
 Federated Mutual entered the life insurance business in Canada effective January 1, 1964.
 Growth continued as the company entered the group health insurance field. Group plans were sold until the provincial governments introduced socialized medicine. A supplemental health plan and dental plan was introduced in 1987.
 In November 1987, the Canadian division was converted to a wholly owned corporate subsidiary operation, Federated Holdings of Canada Ltd., which holds all the stock in the two operating subsidiaries: Federated Insurance Company of Canada and Federated Life Insurance Company of Canada.
 On January 1, 1990 Federated Insurance and Federated Life became fully Canadian owned and operated subsidiaries of Fairfax Financial Holdings Ltd. of Toronto, Ontario, when Federated Insurance Holdings of Canada Ltd. was purchased from Federated Mutual.
 In 1998, Contact+ Insurance Network Ltd. was incorporated as a wholly owned subsidiary of Federated Insurance.
 The year 2000 saw Federated Insurance poised to undertake a series of major change initiatives in response to recognized external and internal drivers. Restructuring came about as result of a desire to improve proximity to and relationships with customers, and to generally, work under more efficient processes. Federated also sought to devote considerable resources to the enormous potential represented in various e-business opportunities.
 In April 2003, Fairfax Financial Holdings formed Northbridge Financial Corporation to serve as the holding company for their Canadian insurance subsidiaries including, Federated Insurance, Lombard Canada Ltd, Commonwealth Insurance Company, and Markel Insurance Company of Canada.
 In May 2004, Federated Holdings of Canada Ltd. announced an agreement to sell Federated Life to Western Financial Group Inc.
 Effective February 28, 2005, the sale of Federated Life to Western Financial Group Inc. was complete.

Northbridge Financial Corporation is a financial services holding company that, through its operating subsidiaries, is engaged in property and casualty insurance in Canada and in selected US and international markets. Northbridge is a wholly owned subsidiary of Fairfax Financial Holdings Ltd.

Product Range
List of products offered by Federated Insurance Company of Canada:

 Commercial Property and Casualty insurance
 Life, disability, and critical illness insurance
 Home and auto insurance

Markets
List of markets in which Federated Insurance Company of Canada operates:

 Automotive Dealers
 Automotive Repair Garages
 Commercial Property
 Equipment Dealers
 Electrical Contractors
 Fuel Dealers
 Grocery Stores
 Home-Builders
 Manufacturers
 Mechanical Contractors
 Motorcycle and Powersports Dealers
 Petroleum Dealers
 Printers
 Professional & Health Services
 Restaurants
 RV Dealers
 Tire Dealers
 Trade Contractors

References

Financial services companies based in Manitoba
Financial services companies established in 1920
Companies based in Winnipeg
Insurance companies of Canada